Andrew Francis Mangan (born 30 August 1986) is an English former footballer who played as a striker. He is currently a first-team coach at Bristol Rovers.

Career

Blackpool
Born in Liverpool, Mangan began his career with Blackpool at the age of 15. He was with the club for three years, scoring 49 goals in reserve and youth team football. Mangan made his professional debut at the age of 17 in a 1–0 defeat to Chesterfield on 24 April 2004. He made just one further professional appearance at Blackpool under Steve McMahon's management and his replacement, Colin Hendry, loaned Mangan to Northern Premier League Premier Division side Hyde United. He scored two goals in seven appearances, helping the club to secure the league title. Mangan was released by Blackpool at the end of the 2004–05 season.

Accrington Stanley
Mangan was heavily linked with a return to Hyde the following season, but he rejected them in favour of a full-time contract with Conference Premier side Accrington Stanley, after impressing during the club's pre-season schedule. After making his debut in a 1–0 win over Canvey Island on 13 August 2005, Mangan scored his first goal for the club in his third appearance during a 3–1 defeat to Cambridge United. In his first full season, Mangan played in 45 league and cup games, scoring ten goals, and was primarily used as a substitute. His goals helped Accrington gain promotion to The Football League at the end of the 2005–06 season; the first time the club had achieved this in 50 years. In his second year at the club, Mangan became frustrated with his lack of starts. From his 38 total appearances, of which only five were made in the starting XI, he scored six goals. At the end of the 2006–07 season, Mangan was offered a two-year deal by Accrington, but rejected it in favour of League Two side Bury, having appeared in a pre-season friendly for the club against Everton.

Bury

At Bury, Mangan scored his first goal on 7 September 2007 with a header against Chesterfield, with five more goals coming before Christmas. He was injured at the beginning of December 2007 with a suspected hernia problem and later underwent surgery, restricting him to just six appearances in the rest of the season as he struggled to regain fitness. He made a total of 26 appearances in all competitions while with Bury. Following the sacking of Bury manager Chris Casper, Mangan was allowed to return to Accrington Stanley by his replacement Alan Knill on a one-month loan deal, scoring one goal in seven appearances. Mangan was released by Bury towards the end of the 2007–08 season.

Forest Green Rovers
In the summer of 2008, Mangan signed for Forest Green Rovers in the Conference Premier. It was at Forest Green that Mangan's goalscoring reputation began to form; his first season saw him finish as the league's top scorer with 26 goals in 41 games. Including cup competitions, Mangan made 49 appearances for the club, scoring 30 goals. These included hat-tricks against Torquay United, Lewes and Rushden & Diamonds. Mangan was voted player of the year by the Directors of Forest Green Rovers.

Betting scandal
On 7 April 2009, one year after leaving Bury, Mangan was named as one of five players charged by the Football Association for breaching betting rules, whereby players, managers or coaching staff are prohibited from betting on the result or progress of any match or competition in which the participant is participating or has any direct or indirect influence. According to the BBC, the charge relates to a match between Bury and Accrington Stanley, before which Mangan is alleged to have placed stakes to the value of approximately £3,500. The Football Association subsequently fined Mangan £2,000 and banned him from playing for five months.

Wrexham
On 20 January 2009, Mangan completed a move to Wrexham for an undisclosed fee, making his debut on 23 January in a 1–0 victory over Wimbledon, before scoring his first goal seven days later in his third appearance during a 3–1 over Altrincham. Mangan then scored his first home goal for Wrexham in a 2–1 victory over Mansfield Town. He ended the 2009–10 season with nine goals, the club's joint top scorer in a campaign which saw the side finish 11th. Mangan started the next season in an unfamiliar left-wing position; despite this he still finished as the club's top scorer with 16 league goals, helping them to the play-offs, where they lost to Luton Town.

Fleetwood Town

On 1 June 2011, he signed for Conference Premier side Fleetwood Town. It was announced on 7 May 2013, that Fleetwood would not be offering the striker a new contract, and would therefore be released.

Forest Green Rovers (second spell)
On 16 May 2013, Mangan returned to former club Forest Green Rovers on a three-year contract. He made his second debut for the club on 7 September 2013 in a draw with Braintree Town. On 5 February 2014, several months after he had been suspended by the club in October 2013, he had his contract terminated. Mangan appealed against his dismissal from the club, meaning that he remained registered as a Forest Green player until the outcome of the appeal, and he subsequently joined Conference Premier leaders Luton Town on loan for the rest of the 2013–14 season on 1 April 2014.

In June 2014, it was announced that Mangan had won his appeal against Forest Green and had returned to the club under his previous contract as a player.

Shrewsbury Town
On 24 July 2014, it was announced that Mangan had signed a one-year deal at League Two club Shrewsbury Town.

He made his Shrewsbury debut as a substitute away at A.F.C. Wimbledon on 9 August, and scored his first goal for the club a week later against Tranmere Rovers, also providing an assist for Mickey Demetriou's injury time winning goal at New Meadow. Mangan earned his first start for the club three days later, scoring twice and winning a penalty in a 4–0 win over former club Accrington Stanley.

On 26 August, he scored the only goal from a free kick as Shrewsbury won away at Leicester City, knocking the Premier League opponents out of the League Cup. The club ultimately reached the fourth round of the competition, drawing Chelsea at home. Mangan scored a late goal to level the scores at 1–1, just moments after entering the field as a substitute,  although Chelsea restored their lead minutes later to win the tie 2–1.

By the end of October 2014, Mangan was joint top scorer at Shrewsbury, alongside James Collins, having scored six goals in all competitions. His seventh goal came days after the Chelsea match, equalising with a half volley away at Dagenham and Redbridge, before winning an injury time penalty which was converted by teammate Liam Lawrence to secure Shrewsbury's fifth straight win in the league. The requirement to carefully manage an ongoing knee injury restricted Mangan's match time over the next few months, although he still managed to score a late winner against Morecambe in December after coming on as a substitute. He marked his first start since November by scoring a brace and providing an assist in a 3–0 home win against Hartlepool United on 17 January 2015, to help move Shrewsbury back into the League Two automatic promotion places.

Shrewsbury were subsequently promoted back to League One at the first attempt, following a 1–0 away win at Cheltenham Town in April 2015, however due to Financial Fair Play restrictions, they were unable to offer Mangan an extension to his contract.

Tranmere Rovers
Mangan joined Tranmere Rovers of the National League on 2 July 2015, signing a one-year contract. He scored seven goals in the first half of the season, including five in four matches during September and October, but lost his place in the team due to injury and manager Gary Brabins' subsequent tactical switch to a 4–5–1 formation with James Norwood preferred in the lone strikers role.

Shrewsbury Town (second spell)
After losing a regular place at Tranmere, Shrewsbury Town made an enquiry about Mangan's availability in the next transfer window. He rejoined the club on an 18-month contract on 7 January 2016. He made his return debut in an FA Cup tie away at Cardiff City three days later, scoring the only goal in a 1–0 victory, sending Shrewsbury through to the fourth-round for the first time since 2002–03. He missed a penalty on his home return against Barnsley, but scored a second-half equaliser at Burton Albion the following week, with Shrewsbury going on to win 2–1 at the league leaders. Mangan scored five goals in nineteen league appearances in the second half of the 2015−16 season to help the club avoid relegation to League Two. During the 2015−16 season Mangan received the PFA community champion as recognition for his work with children in the Shrewsbury area.

Return to Tranmere Rovers
Mangan re-joined Tranmere Rovers for an undisclosed fee on 4 November 2016.

He was released by Tranmere at the end of the 2017–18 season.

Bala Town
On 17 June 2018, he joined Welsh Premier League side Bala Town. He made his debut for the club on 28 June 2018 in a 3–0 away Europa League preliminary round first leg defeat to S.P. Tre Fiori.

Accrington Stanley
Mangan departed Bala without playing a league game for them after receiving an offer from Accrington Stanley.

Coaching career

Fleetwood Town
On 22 February 2019, Mangan joined the first-team coaching staff of Fleetwood Town, after a spell working with the youth team. Following the departure of manager Joey Barton in January 2021, Mangan also left the club.

Bristol Rovers
On 22 February 2021, Mangan followed Barton and Clint Hill from Fleetwood to Bristol Rovers, taking on the role as a first-team coach. On 14 December 2022, Mangan was charged by the FA over an alleged homophobic comment during a League One 2–2 draw with Plymouth Argyle two months prior.

Career statistics

Footnotes
A. One appearance and one goal in the Football League Trophy.
B. Three appearances in the Football League Trophy.
C. Two appearances in the Football League Trophy.
D. Two appearances in the FA Trophy.
E. Two appearances and one goal in the Football Conference play-offs.
F. One appearance in the Football League Trophy.
G. One appearance in the FA Trophy.
H. Two appearances in the EFL Trophy.
I. Four appearances and one goal in the FA Trophy, three appearances in the National League play-offs.

Honours
Accrington Stanley
Conference National: 2005–06

Fleetwood Town
Conference Premier: 2011–12

References

External links

1986 births
Living people
Footballers from Liverpool
English footballers
England semi-pro international footballers
Association football forwards
Blackpool F.C. players
Hyde United F.C. players
Accrington Stanley F.C. players
Bury F.C. players
Forest Green Rovers F.C. players
Wrexham A.F.C. players
Fleetwood Town F.C. players
Shrewsbury Town F.C. players
Tranmere Rovers F.C. players
English Football League players
National League (English football) players
Bala Town F.C. players
Fleetwood Town F.C. non-playing staff
Bristol Rovers F.C. non-playing staff
Sportspeople involved in betting scandals